Sembiin Gonchigsumlaa (1915-1991) was a Mongolian composer, generally considered to have been one of the greatest contributors to modern Mongolian national music and classical music. He is credited with being the first to write Mongolian ballet music. He was also a Merited Artiste and Chairman of the Composers' Union.

Selected works

Symphonic music 

 Symphonic poem, 1950
 Symphony, 1952
 Symphonic poem about the Mongolian People's Revolutionary Party, 1955
 Symphony No. 1, 1964 
 Symphony No. 2, 1974
 Symphony No. 3 (in memory of G. Dmitrov),  1982
 Piano Concerto, 1983
 Cello Concerto, 1985
 Symphony No. 4, 1986
 Symphony No. 5 (in memory of E. Telman), 1988

For Piano 

 24 Preludes for Piano, 1978 and 1979

Gonchigsumlaa also composed more than 200 compositions for piano based on folk songs and his own themes.

References

Mongolian composers
1915 births
1991 deaths
20th-century composers
20th-century male musicians
Male composers
People's Artists of Mongolia